Zhang Dongshuang (born 13 December 1989) is a Chinese sailor. She competed in the Laser Radial event at the 2020 Summer Olympics.

References

External links
 

1989 births
Living people
Chinese female sailors (sport)
Olympic sailors of China
Sailors at the 2020 Summer Olympics – Laser Radial
Asian Games medalists in sailing
Sailors at the 2010 Asian Games
Sailors at the 2014 Asian Games
Sailors at the 2018 Asian Games
Medalists at the 2014 Asian Games
Medalists at the 2018 Asian Games
Asian Games gold medalists for China
Asian Games silver medalists for China
21st-century Chinese women